Edwin Moalosi (born 26 October 1988) is a Motswana football player currently signed to Botswana Premier League club Township Rollers. He made his Botswana debut in 2018 against Lesotho.

Club career
Moalosi first came to public attention as part of the BMC squad in the 2007-08 Botswana Premier League season. At the end of the season he joined Gaborone giants Township Rollers, where he spent two seasons before moving to the United States of America to pursue his studies. While abroad he represented a number of university football teams. Moalosi returned home in 2014 and rejoined Rollers

International career
Edwin Moalosi made his international debut on 24 March 2018 in a friendly match against Lesotho by coming on as a 56th minute substitute. He is yet to appear again for the Zebras.

Honours

Club
 Township Rollers
Botswana Premier League:5
2009-10, 2015-16, 2016-17, 2017-18, 2018-19
FA Cup:1
2009-10
Mascom Top 8 Cup:1
2017-18

Individual honours
Botswana FA Cup Player of the Tournament: 2010
Botswana Premier League Supporters' Player of the Season: 2010
Botswana Premier League Player of the Season: 2018
Botswana Premier League Players' Player of the Season: 2018

References

External links

1988 births
Living people
Botswana footballers
Botswana international footballers
Association football midfielders
Botswana expatriate footballers
Expatriate soccer players in the United States
Township Rollers F.C. players
Gilport Lions F.C. players
South Florida Bulls men's soccer players
People from South-East District (Botswana)